Post-traumatic stress disorder (PTSD) is an anxiety disorder that may develop after an individual experiences a traumatic event. In the United States, the Social Security Administration and the Department of Veterans Affairs each offer disability compensation programs that provide benefits for qualified individuals with mental disorders, including PTSD. Because of the substantial benefits available to individuals with a confirmed PTSD diagnosis, which causes occupational impairment, the distinct possibility of Type I errors (false positive results) exists, some of which are due to malingering of PTSD.

Motivation
Individuals who malinger PTSD may have several motivations for doing so. First, financial incentives are common. For example, the Department of Veterans Affairs offers substantial annual financial compensation to U.S. veterans who can prove that they have PTSD related to their military service. This potential compensation can create an incentive for veterans to malinger PTSD. Furthermore, the U.S. Social Security Administration offers social security disability payments to individuals documenting a disorder such as PTSD that impedes their ability to work, which additionally provides an incentive to malinger PTSD. Additionally, the potential for workers compensation can motivate individuals reporting a traumatic event at their workplace to fabricate PTSD; and finally the potential for personal injury lawsuits can motivate someone to malinger PTSD and sue an individual for causing PTSD as a result of attack, accident or other stressor.

Some individuals are known to malinger PTSD to obtain inpatient hospital treatment. Persons charged in criminal law cases are motivated to malinger PTSD in order to offset criminal responsibility for the crime or mitigate the associated penalties. Some individuals are motivated to malinger PTSD (e.g., related to combat) in order to gain honor and recognition from others.

Psychological assessment findings
The Minnesota Multiphasic Personality Inventory-2 (MMPI-2) is the most widely used psychological assessment measure that has been used in research to detect malingered PTSD, typically by comparing genuine PTSD patients with individuals trained and instructed to fabricate PTSD on the MMPI-2. Numerous studies using the MMPI-2 have demonstrated a moderately accurate ability to detect simulated PTSD. Validity scales on the MMPI-2 that are reasonably accurate at detecting simulated PTSD include both the Fp scale developed by Paul Arbisi and Yosef Ben-Porath, and the Fptsd scale developed by Jon Elhai.

Other psychological test instruments have been investigated for PTSD malingering detection ability, but have not approached the accuracy rates of the MMPI-2. These tests include the Personality Assessment Inventory and Trauma symptom inventory. The current literature modestly supports the effectiveness of the Personality Assessment Inventory or PAI at detecting malingering of posttraumatic stress disorder or PTSD.  Although results are mixed, the validity indicators of the PAI have been found to be effective at differentiating malingered PTSD from a diagnostically supported diagnosis of PTSD. Specifically, the negative impression management or NIM scale, the malingering index scale or MAL, and the negative distortion validity scale or NDS of the PAI are interpreted in detecting malingering of PTSD.

References

Anxiety disorders
Factitious disorders
Post-traumatic stress disorder